Juanita Williams may refer to:
 Juanita Williams, singer of an album released by Golden World Records
 Juanita Williams, survivor of Delta Air Lines Flight 191
 Juanita Terry Williams (1925–2000), member of the Georgia House of Representatives in 1985–93, and spouse of civil rights leader Hosea Williams

See also
Juanita Wilson, Irish director and writer